Tom Cox (born 4 October 1988) is an Australian rugby union player. His playing position is winger, centre or fullback.

He joined the  Super Rugby squad prior to the 2012 Super Rugby season on a two-year deal.  He made one senior appearance for them,  against  during the 2012 Wales rugby union tour of Australia. Post shoulder surgery he joined the  Wider Training Squad for the 2014 Super Rugby season but was hampered by ankle injury.

After taking time to complete university degrees at the University of Queensland, he joined the Timișoara Saracens prior to the 2015 SuperLiga season.

External links

References

1988 births
Living people
Australian rugby union players
Rugby union wings
ACT Brumbies players
Rugby union players from Queensland